Talakondapally is a mandal in Ranga Reddy district, Telangana, India.

Institutions;
 Zilla Parishad Primary School
 K.G.G.B.V. High School
 Akshara School of Excellence[Akshara school of excellence is formed by Akshara Educational and Cultural Society]

Villages
The villages in Talakondapally mandal include:
 Antharam 	
 Chandradana 	
 Cheepunuthala 	
 Chowder Pally 	
 Chukkapur 	
 Gattu Ippalapally 	
 Jangareddy Pally
 Julapally	
 Khanapur 	
 Lingaraopally
 RamaKrishnaPuram	
 Medakpally 	
 Padkal, (It has famous historical Sri Venkateswara Swami Temple, the actual name of the village is Devuni Padakal)
 Rampur 	
 Nayamatapoor
 Salarpur 
 Sangaya Pally/ Sangai Palle	
 Talakondapally  (Haryay naik thanda, syrya naik thanda, laxmi thanda, thummala kunta thanda,.) 	
 Veljala 
 Venkatapur 	
 Venkatraopeta

References

Mandals in Ranga Reddy district